Anthomyia confusanea is a species of fly in the family Anthomyiidae. It is found in the Palearctic.

References

External links
 Ecology of Commanster

Anthomyiidae
Insects described in 1985